Mehr-e Sofla (also Romanized as Mehr-e Soflá; also known as Mast-e Pā’īn, Mast-e Soflá, and Mast-i-Pain) is a village in Enaj Rural District, Qareh Chay District, Khondab County, Markazi Province, Iran. At the 2006 census, its population was 2,432, in 670 families.

References 

Populated places in Khondab County